Felipe de Almeida Gomes (born January 5, 1988), known as just Felipe, is a Brazilian football player.

References

jsgoal.jp

1988 births
Living people
Brazilian footballers
Brazilian expatriate footballers
J2 League players
América Futebol Clube (RN) players
Vegalta Sendai players
Fukushima United FC players
Expatriate footballers in Japan
Association football forwards
Footballers from Rio de Janeiro (city)